Bearsden South is one of the seven wards used to elect members of the East Dunbartonshire Council. It elects three Councillors. As its name suggests, its territory (which has not altered since its creation in 2007) consists of the southern part of the burgh of Bearsden, with part of the boundary to the north following the path of the Antonine Wall; it also borders the Drumchapel housing estate in Glasgow – the marked differences in average life expectancy and other factors between residents living in close proximity in the two areas has been remarked upon in various studies.

The southern boundary is formed largely from the Forth and Clyde Canal and the River Kelvin, with other parts of northern Glasgow on the opposite banks. In 2020, the ward had a population of 13,318.

Councillors

Election results

2022 election
2022 East Dunbartonshire Council election

2017 election
2017 East Dunbartonshire Council election

2012 election
2012 East Dunbartonshire Council election

2009 by-election

2007 election
2007 East Dunbartonshire Council election

References

Wards of East Dunbartonshire
Bearsden